The Military Band Service of the Armed Forces of the Russian Federation serves as the official service of military bands in active service within the Russian Armed Forces and formerly the Soviet Armed Forces. It is part of the Military Band Service Directorate of the General Staff of the Armed Forces of the Russian Federation.

Senior Directors 

 Major General Semyon Tchernetsky (1924–1949)
 Major General Ivan Petrov  (1950–1958)
 Major General Nikolai Nazarov  (1958–1976)
 Major General Nikolai Mikhailov (1976–1993)
 Lieutenant General Viktor Afanasyev (1993–2002)
 Lieutenant General Valery Khalilov (2002–2016)
 Major General Timofey Mayakin (2016–Present)

History 

For a country that has not just one of the largest armed forces in the world but also has produced some of the greatest composers and musicians, the MBS-AFR is one of the oldest institutions of military music in Europe and the world, founded by Peter the Great as per Ukaz № 2319 enacted on Feb. 19, 1711, which mandated the formation of military bands and field music formations within both the Imperial Russian Army and the nascent Imperial Russian Navy following the Western practices. As both the Army's two foundation regiments (the Preobrazhensky Regiment and the Semyonovsky Regiment) had their own bands and corps of drums, which would also inspire the formation of the bands and fanfare band units within the artillery and the cavalry, the age of Peter the Great, aside from laying the foundation of the armed forces, also began centuries of the Russian military band tradition, which continues until today. In the 1870s, a post called the Inspector of Naval Bands, held by composer Nikolai Rimsky-Korsakov until its abolishment, became the starting point for the official organized arrangement of military bands. In 1922, the Inspectorate of the Military Bands of the Red Army and Navy was formed, renamed in 1955 as the current Military Band Service. In October 1924, the post of Inspector of Military Bands of the Red Army. As of 1947, Inspectorate of Military Bands reported directly to the head of the 3rd Division of the Combat Training Department of the Soviet Army Headquarters, where it was transferred to on 1 December 1931. Its modern functions and duties were established in an order signed by the Chief of the General Staff Viktor Samsonov on 22 November 1996. In November 2007, by the approval of President Dmitry Medvedev, the band service created a charter for the conductors of garrison bands to have more authority over their events and activities. In 2011, the service celebrated 300 years of Russian military music.

Activities 

Annual concert activity of the military band service began inside the hall of the Philharmonic Society of St. Petersburg in November 1813.

Senior Director of Music and regional directors 
The office of Senior Director of Music of the Military Band Service is the operational and administrative leader of the service. His/her role is laid out in a decree from Soviet Defence Minister Rodion Malinovsky dating back to July 1963. Local military bands of military garrisons and units are managed by the chiefs of the military bands services of the military districts, with their appointment being as the Senior Director of Music. As such, local conductors report to the director and are accountable to him/her only.

Mass service-wide events 
Over 1,000 musicians of the service divided into 40 bands participate in the annual Victory Day parades and before 1991 the October Revolution and May 1 parades as well. The service is an active sponsor of the annual Spasskaya Tower Military Music Festival and Tattoo in Moscow. Joint military concerts are commonly held between the bands of the service and foreign military bands on Russian and foreign soil. Mass events were held on the service's tricentennial in 2011. Every couple of years, officials from the service conduct contests  to identify the best bands in the service as well as inspections to identify those that retain the standard for bands. In 1928, the first national competition of military bands being held.

Individual bands 
The military band service provides military bands for the Kremlin Regiment and the 154th Preobrazhensky Independent Commandant's Regiment during special occasions and state visit.

Composition 

The composition of the Military Band Service of the Armed Forces of the Russian Federation include:
 General Office of the Military Band Service of the Russian Defense Ministry
 Exemplary Bands (bands that have specific duties and representative activities that therefore make them the seniormost in the armed forces)
 Central Military Band of the Ministry of Defense of Russia
 Central Navy Band of Russia
 Exemplary Military Band (Honor Guard)
 Training Schools
 Military University College of Military Music and Military Band Conductors School (formerly the Military Bandmaster department of the Moscow State Tchaikovsky Conservatory)
 Moscow Suvorov Military Music College Lieutenant-General VM Khalilov
 Regional Bands
 Headquarters bands of military districts
 Unit bands
 Bands of groups of forces and separate armies
 Bands of naval fleets and marine bases
 Bands within military units and formations and in military schools

Not under the armed forces but affiliated to the Band Service:
 Presidential Band of the Russian Federation – under the Kremlin Regiment of the Federal Protective Service
 Military Band Service of the National Guard of Russia
 Military Band Service of the Ministry of Emergency Situations of Russia
 Central Band of the Border Guard Service of the Federal Security Service of Russia
 Police Band Service of the Ministry of Internal Affairs of Russia

The Band of the Moscow Garrison is in that it consists of the 190 quality musicians who come together from different exemplary bands throughout the former Moscow Military District. At one time, it included the Headquarter Band of the MVO, the Combined Band of the Internal Troops, the Band of the Military Institute of Military Conductors, the Band of the Military Academy of the Strategic Rocket Forces, the Band of the Moscow Higher Military Command School, and the Band of the 147 Automobile Base of the Ministry of Defense. The support all important state events and special events in the Russian capital, including military parades on Red Square and international music festivals.

Current Formation of Massed Bands 

Formation in Moscow
 Chromatic Fanfare Trumpets, Field Drums, 1st Glockenspiels
 Trumpets, Cornets, Flugelhorns
 1st Trombones
 1st and 2nd Marching Percussion
 Snare drums
 Bass drums and Cymbals
 Turkish crescents
 2nd Glockenspiels
 2nd Trombones
 Horns, Mellophones
 Clarinets, Oboes, Saxophones, Bassoons, Flutes and Piccolos
 Baritone horns, Tenor horns, Saxhorns
 Euphoniums, Wagner Tubas, Tubas, Sousaphones

Formation in St Petersburg

 Chromatic Fanfare Trumpets (optional)
 Field Drums (optional)
 Trumpets
 1st Trombones, Horns and Woodwinds
 Clarinets, Saxophones
 Marching Percussion
 Snare Drums
 Bass drums
 Cymbals
 Turkish crescent (since 2011)
 Glockenspiels
 2nd Trombones and Horns
 2nd Woodwinds
 Clarinets, Oboes, Bassoons, Flutes, Piccolos
 Saxophones
 Saxhorns, Baritone and tenor horns, Euphoniums, Wagner tubas
 Tubas, Sousaphones (optional)

Formation in Yekaterinburg
 Chromatic Fanfare Trumpets
 Field Drums (optional)
 Trumpets, Cornets
 Trombones and Horns
 Saxophones
 Clarinets, Oboes, Bassoons, Flutes, Piccolos
 Marching Percussion
 Snare Drums
 Bass drums
 Cymbals
 Turkish crescent
 Glockenspiels
 Saxhorns, Baritone and tenor horns, Euphoniums, Wagner tubas
 Tubas, Sousaphones (optional)

Symbols 

The emblems and patches of the band service were adopted by order of Defence Minister Sergei Ivanov on 7 February 2005.

Common elements of military band symbols include:

Lyre (traditional emblem of military musicians worldwide)
Red color (traditional color of the instrument cloth of military personnel in military bands)
Emblem of the Russian Armed Forces 
Oak wreath

References

See also 
 Russian military bands
 Music Branch (Canadian Forces)
 Royal Corps of Army Music
 Military Music Center of the Bundeswehr
 Australian Army Band Corps
 Military Band Service (Kazakhstan)
 Swedish Armed Forces Music Corps

Russian military bands